This is a list of programmes produced by ITV Studios, the television production company owned by the British television broadcaster ITV plc. This list includes shows from the American division with labels Tomorrow Studios and Leftfield Pictures among others and the UK division with Potato and 12 Yard.

ITV Studios

Granada Productions

London Weekend Television

Yorkshire Television

Tyne Tees Television

Meridian

Anglia

Cosgrove Hall Films

Carlton Television

ATV

Central

HTV

Zodiac Entertainment

ITC Entertainment

Lifted Entertainment

Mammoth Screen

Potato

Twofour
{| class="wikitable sortable"
|-
! Title
! Network
! Original running
! Notes
|-
| Great Westerners || rowspan="2" | ITV || 1994 ||
|-
| On the Moor || 1995 ||
|-
| Watercolour Challenge || Channel 4/Channel 5 || 1998–present || continued from Planet 24
|-
| Dead Famous || LivingTV || 2004–2006 ||
|-
| The Hotel Inspector || Channel 5 || 2005–present ||
|-
| Born to Kill? || Sky One/Channel 5 || 2005–2016 ||
|-
| Break with the Boss || Living TV || 2006 ||
|-
| Challenge Anneka || ITVChannel 5 || 2006–20072023–present || continued from Mentorn and ITV Studiosco-production with Krempelwood Entertainment
|-
| Are You Smarter than a 10 Year Old? || Sky One || 2007–2010 || co-production with Mark Burnett Productions
|-
| Noel's HQ || Sky One || 2008–2009 ||
|-
| Ty Pennington's Great British Adventure || Home || 2008–2010 ||
|-
| Big Chef Takes on Little Chefs || Channel 4 || 2009 || 
|-
| Dating in the Dark || Sky Living/ITV2 || 2009–2016 || Previously produced by Initial
|-
| Road Warriors || ITV || rowspan="2" | 2010 ||
|-
| High Street Dreams || BBC One ||
|-
| My Funniest Year || Channel 4 || 2010–2011 ||
|-
| Choccywoccydoodah || Good Food || 2011–2016 ||
|-
| Educating || Channel 4 || 2011–2020 ||
|-
| Paddy's Show and Telly || rowspan="2" | ITV || 2011–2012 || co-production with GroupM Entertainment
|-
| Cornwall with Caroline Quentin || 2012–2013 ||
|-
| Alex Polizzi: The Fixer || BBC Two || 2012–2015 ||
|-
| The Exclusives || ITV2 || rowspan="4" | 2012
|-
| Home of the Future || Channel 4 ||
|-
| The Angel || Sky One ||
|-
| A Night of Heroes: The Sun Military Awards || rowspan="2' | ITV ||
|-
| Splash! || 2013–2014 ||
|-
| Kavos Weekender || ITV2 || 2013–present || co-production with Motion Content Group
|-
| James Nesbitt's Ireland || ITV || 2013 ||
|-
| The Jump || Channel 4 || 2014–2017 || co-production with Motion Content Group
|-
| Killing Spree || Channel 5 || 2014 ||
|-
| The Housing Enforcers || BBC One || 2014–present ||
|-
| Our School || CBBC || 2014–present ||
|-
| Taking New York || E4 || 2015 ||
|-
| Impossible Engineering || Yesterday || 2015–present ||
|-
| Alex Polizzi: Chefs on Trial || BBC Two || 2015 ||
|-
| Eternal Glory || ITV || 2015 ||
|-
| The Real Marigold Hotel || BBC One || 2016–present ||
|-
| Motherland || BBC Two || 2016–present || continued from Delightful Industries; co-production with Merman and Lionsgate UK
|-
| This Time Next Year || ITV || 2016–2019 ||
|-
| Spectacular Spain with Alex Polizzi || Channel 5 || 2017–present ||
|-
| Change Your Tune || rowspan="2" | ITV || rowspan="3" | 2018 ||
|-
| Our Shirley Valentine Summer ||
|-
| Take the Tower || ITV4 ||
|-
| Save Money Lose Weight || ITV || 2019–present ||
|-
| Beat the Chef || Channel 4 || 2019–present || co-production with Motion Content Group
|-
| Skin A&E || 5Star || 2019–present || continued from Boomerangco-production with Boom Cymru
|-
| Win the Wilderness: Alaska || BBC Two || 2020 ||
|-
| The Chocolate Challenge || Channel 5 || 2020 || co-production with Motion Content Group
|-
| Cornwall and Devon Walks with Julia Bradbury || rowspan="2" | ITV || 2021 ||
|-
| Million Pound Pawn || 2021–2022 ||
|-
| Happy Campers: The Holiday Camp || Channel 5 || 2021–present || co-production with Motion Content Group
|-
| Bling! || ITV || 2021–present || co-production with Possessed
|-
| Hotel Benidorm: Sun, Sea & Sangria || Channel 5 || 2022–present
|-
| Make Me Prime Minister || Channel 4 || 2022 || co-production with Accidentally on Purpose
|-
| Loaded in Paradise || ITVX || 2022–present || co-production with Motion Content Group
|}

Boomerang

12 Yard

Possessed

Silverprint Pictures

Multistory Media

Big Talk Productions

The Garden

Oxford Scientific Films

Gameface

Second Act Productions

Crook Productions

Noho Film and Television

Tall Story Pictures

So Television

Mainstreet Pictures

World Productions

ITV America

 ITV Entertainment 

 Granada Entertainment 

 Granada America 

Tomorrow Studios

Leftfield Pictures

Sirens Media

Outpost Entertainment

Loud TV

ThinkFactory Media

Twofour America

Gurney Productions

High Noon Entertainment

Red Bandit Media

ITV Studios Global Distribution

ITV Studios Australia

ITV Studios Germany

Granada Germany

ITV Studios France

Television films and specials
ITV Studios
 My Friend Michael Jackson: Uri's Story (2009)
 Joanna Lumley: Catwoman (2009)
 Miscarriage: Our Story (2020)

Granada Productions
 Stalin: Inside the Terror (2003)
 Middle Sexes: Redefining He & She (2005)
 Whatever Love Means (2005)
 Titanic: Birth of a Legend (2005)
 Dracula (2006) (co-production with WGBH Boston)

Carlton Television
 Goodnight Mister Tom (1998)
 Cider with Rosie (1998)
 The Railway Children (2000)
 Blue Murder (2000)

ITC Entertainment
 Julie on Sesame Street (1973) (co-production with Associated Television)
 Les Misérables (1978)
 Jennifer: A Woman's Story (1979)
 All Quiet on the Western Front (1979)
 The Scarlet and the Black (1983) (co-production with RAI and Bill McCutchen Productions)
 Jane Doe (1983)
 Sunset Limousine (1983)
 Secrets of a Married Man (1984) (co-production with RAI)
 Unnatural Causes (1986)
 Christmas Comes to Willow Creek (1987) (co-production with Blue Andre Productions)
 Fear Stalk (1989) (co-production with Donald March Productions)
 Her Wicked Ways (1991) (co-production with Lois Luger Productions, Freyda Rothstein Productions and Bar-Gene Productions
 When Love Kills: The Seduction of John Heran (1993) (co-production with Harvey Kahn Productions, McGillen Entertainment and Alexander Enright & Associates)

Lifted Entertainment
 University Challenge at 60 (2022)

Twofour
 Ginger Nation (2002)
 Crip on a Trip (2006)
 Fame Asylum (2006)
 The British Suck in Bed (2008)
 100 Greatest Toys (2010)
 Graffti Wars (2011) (co-production with One Productions)
 Dogs on a Dole (2015)
 My Big Fat Wedding (2015)

Possessed
 Spotless (2016)

Multistory Media
 Goodbye Balance (2010)
 Paul McCartney & Wings: Band on the Run (2010)
 The Betty Driver Story (2011) (co-production with Table Twelve Media)
 Farewell Liz (2011)
 When Ali Came to Britain (2012)
 William & Kate: The First Year (2012)
 Channel 4's 30 Greatest Comedy Shows (2012)
 30 Years of CITV (2012)
 Being Poriot (2013) (co-production with Acorn Productions and Agatha Christie Ltd.)
 Coronation Street: A Moving Story (2014)
 Michael Flatley: A Night to Remember (2014)
 Gail & Me: 40 Years on Coronation Street (2014)
 Executed (2014)
 Trawlerman's Lives (2014)
 Hot Tub Britain (2014)
 Churchill: 100 Days That Saved Britain (2015)
 The Nation's Favourite 70s Number One (2015)
 Reggie & Thunderbirds: No Strings Attached (2015)
 Unforgettable Election Moments: 60 Years On (2015)
 The Magic Show Story (2015)
 Let's Do It: A Tribute to Victoria Wood (2016)
 The Natives: This Is Our America (2017)
 Coronation Street Special: From Here to Now (2018)
 Return to Belsen (2020)
 Hitched at Home: Our Lockdown Wedding (2020)
 Stephen Lawrence: Has Britain Changed? (2020)
 The Real 'Des': The Dennis Nilsen Story (2020)
 Flying for Britain with David Jason (2020)
 Carols at Christmas (2020)
 How to Catch a Cat Killer (2022)
 The Young Elizabeth (2022)
 Charles: The Monarch and the Man (2022)

The Garden
 The Merits of Ferrets (2012)
 Crucifixion (2012)
 The Kidnap Diaries (2012)
 Kicked Out Kids (2012)
 Who Killed Sharon Birchwood? Police Tapes (2018)
 Spying On My Family (2018)
 Mars: One Day on the Red Planet (2020)
 The Unshockable Dr. Ronx (2020)
 Henry VIII & Trump: History Repeating? (2020)
 April Jones: The Interrogation Tapes (2020)

Gameface
 Groundhog Date (2019)

World Productions
 Wide-Eyed and Legless (1993)
 Hostile Waters (1997)
 Perfect Day: The Wedding (2005)
 Perfect Day: The Millennium (2006)
 Perfect Day: The Funeral (2006)
 Hancock and Joan (2008)
 United (2011)

ITV America
 Perfectly Prudence (2011)

Thinkfactory Media
 Dating Game Killer (2018)
 The Lover in the Attic: A True Story (2018)
 A Lover Scorned (2019) (co-production with Swirl Films)

Carlton America
 Half a Dozen Babies (1999)
 A Secret Affair (1999)
 The Test of Love (1999)
 Murder in the Mirror (2000) (co-production with Catfish Productions and Larry Thompson Entertainment)
 Love Lessons (2000) (co-production with Carla Singer Productions)
 The Christmas Secret (2000) (co-production with CBS Productions)
 The Wandering Soul Murders (2001)
 The Triangle (2001) (co-production with George Street Productions and Orly Anderson Productions)
 The Wedding Dress (2001) (co-production with Sarabande Productions)
 Dead in a Heartbeat (2002)
 Seconds to Spare (2002)
 Atomic Twister (2002)
 Scent of Danger (2002)
 Murder in Greenwich (2002)
 Rudy: The Rudy Giuliani Story (2003)
 Lucky 7 (2003)
 Code 11–14 (2003)
 Rush of Fear (2003)
 Blessings (2003)
 Undercover Christmas (2003)
 Maiden Voyage Ocean Hijack (2004)

Granada America
 The Survivors Club (2004)
 The Dead Will Tell (2004) (co-production with Barbara Lieberman Productions, One Light Productions and Robert Greenwald Productions)
 Odd Girl Out (2005) (co-production with Lift Production Services and Jaffe/Braunstein Films)
 Heartless (2005) (co-production with Grossbart Kent Productions)
 Murder on Pleasant Drive (2006) (co-production with Dan Wigutow Productions and KZ Productions)
 Firestorm: Last Stand at Yellowstone (2006)
 Life Is Not a Fairy Tale: The Fantasia Barrino Story (2006) (co-production with Lift Productions and Ostar Productions)
 Why I Wore Lipstick to My Mastectomy (2006)
 Santa Baby (2006)
 Wide Awake (2007) (co-production with Chesler/Pearlmutter Productions)
 Housesitter (2007) (co-production with Sound Venture and Muse Entertainment)
 Write & Wrong (2007) (co-production with Jaffe/Braunstein Films)
 Matters of Life and Dating (2007)
 Love Sick: Secrets of a Sex Addict (2008)
 True Confessions of a Go-Go Girl (2008) (co-production with Nomadic Pictures and Go-Go Productions)
 Dear Prudence (2008) (co-production with Alberta Film Entertainment and Alexander/Mitchell Productions)
 The One That Got Away (2008) (co-production with Pope Productions and Shaftesbury Films)
 Toxic Skies (2008) (co-production with Ignite Entertainment and Johnson Production Group)
 Moonlight and Mistletoe (2008)
 The Christmas Choir (2008) (co-production with Tower Pictures and Muse Entertainment)
 The Most Wonderful Time of the Year (2008)
 A Very Merry Daughter of the Bride (2008)
 What Color is Love? (2009)
 Diverted (2009)
 Storm Seekers (2009)

Leftfield Pictures
 Hallmark Heroes with Regis Philbin (2008)
 Billy the Kid: New Evidence (2015)
 Brain Surgery Live with Mental Floss (2015)
 Killer Curves: Bodies to Die For (2018)

Tomorrow Studios
 The Fluffy Shop (2016) (co-production with ABC Signature Studios)
 Dan the Weatherman (2018) (co-production with 20th Century Fox Television)

High Noon Entertainment
 Life After Katrina (2006)
 Stud Finder (2009)
 Nick & Vanessa's Dream Wedding (2011)
 HGTV: Making of Our Magazine (2011)
 Pumpkin Palooza (2011)
 Cheap Bites (2012)
 Trip of a Lifetime (2013)
 Disney Cruise Line: Behind the Magic (2013)
 Walt Disney World Resort Hotels (2014)
 The 12 Foods of Christmas (2016)
 Halloween Craziet'' (2021)

ITV Studios Global Entertainment

References

ITV-related lists
ITV